KK Ibar is a professional basketball club from Rožaje, Montenegro. The team currently competes in the Erste Basketball League. They gained their status of a first division team by winning the second division league Prva B Liga in 2011/12. The club also competes in all leagues for younger players.

History
KK Ibar was founded in 1981. by Faruk Tabaković and Faruk Kalić in Rožaje, SFR Yugoslavia.
The club doesn't have huge successes in their history. The biggest success of the senior team is the title of Prva B Liga Championship in 2012. and the 2012/13 placement in the quarter final of the Montenegrin Cup.

Sports Center

Sports Center Rožaje (Bosnian/Montenegrin: Sportski centar Rožaje) is a sport center located in Rožaje, Montenegro.
The sports center is located on Bandžovo Brdo, next to the main city football stadium. Construction of this sports complex began in 2006. The director is Rešid Pepić. The complex was created by the decision of The Municipal Assembly of Rožaje number 1383 from 10.07.2006. The main activity of the complex is the management and maintenance of sports facilities as well as:
providing services in the field of sports and recreation
provision of sport competitions for the organization of sports events and training
provision of services to citizens and working collectives in sport and recreational activities
organizing sports and cultural and public events

The main arena is built for various sports, such as:
Basketball
Handball
Futsal
Table tennis
Indoor tennis
Volleyball
and other

Supporters

Ibar fans are known as Gazije (Arabic: ghāzī or ghazah/gazi, from ghazw, pl. ghazawāt, armed incursion with the intention of conquering - Gazije were the defenders of Islam (Islamic fighters) in the period of the Ottoman Empire). The group is founded in 1996. The group's traditional colours are black and white, which are also the colours of the football club FK Ibar where Gazije first started giving their support. After the football club failed to reach the First Montenegrin League in 2006., 2007. and 2008., the footballers lost the support of fans since they failed to win the away play-off match against FK Dečić for the First league placement. The basketball club was first time supported by a big group of supporters in the first matches of Erste League.

Honours

Domestic competitions

League
Prva Erste Liga
Winners (0): none
Runners-up (0): none

Prva B Liga
Winners (1): 2012
Runners-up (0): none

Cups
Montenegrin Basketball Cup
Winners (0): none
Runners-up (0): noneBest placement: Quarter finals (2014–15)'

Players

Current roster

Depth chart

Squad changes for the 2013–14 season

In
 Goran Oluić (from  Quintanar)
 Nemanja Simović (from  KK Ibar Junior Team)
 Alen Dacić (from  KK Ibar Junior Team)

Out
 Živojin Grubović (to  KK Pärnu)
 Brandon Roberson (to  KB RTV 21)
 Mersudin Košuta
 Filip Simić (to  KK Radnički OB)
 Vladimir Čuljković
 Demir Kalić
 John Clack

2012/13 Results

2013/14 Results

First Erste League - Regular season

Notable players
In the short history of the basketball club Ibar from Rožaje, the best players who played for the club are from the team which lead this team to the First Montenegrin league in front with Mersudin Kušuta. Most of those players play still in the club. In the first appearances as a top league team, one of the most notable players was Brandon Roberson from the United States who left the club after the first half of the season 2012/2013.

Notable former players
  Brandon Roberson

Sponsorships

References

External links
Eurobasket.com KK Ibar Page
Official Website
Official Blog
Official supporters website
Brandon Roberson Highlights
Basketball in Rožaje

Rožaje
Ibar Rozaje
Sport in Rožaje
Basketball teams in Yugoslavia